Antônio Salim Curiati (Avaré, Brazil, 13 February 1928) is a Brazilian physician, and politician. He was Mayor of São Paulo from 13 May 1982 to 14 March 1983.

Early life

He is the son of Lebanese immigrants. Initially he studied at Scholar Group "Matilde Vieira" in Avaré, but later moved to São Paulo and attended the Colégio Marista Arquidiocesano. He later joined the Escola Paulista de Medicina where he could become an otolaryngologist.

Political life

He was State Deputy for São Paulo in 1966 for the first time. He served as Federal Deputy from 1987 to 1991, during which time he participated in the Constituent Assembly of 1988, which drew up Brazil’s first democratic after the military dictatorship (1964–1985). In 2006 he was elected for his eighth term as State Deputy.

Short Term as Mayor and Secretarial Roles

He was Mayor of São Paulo from 13 May 1982 to 14 March 1983 and is one of the main characters of the Progressive Party (PP) (Portuguese: Partido Progressista), in São Paulo.

He also served as State Secretary of Social Promotion during Paulo Maluf term as Governor of São Paulo from 1979 to 1982, City Secretary of Family and Social Welfare (1993 to 1994), and City Secretary of Community Affairs (1995 to 1998).

References

Mayors of São Paulo
1928 births
Living people
People from São Paulo (state)
Brazilian people of Lebanese descent
Progressistas politicians
Brazilian surgeons
Otolaryngologists
Members of the Chamber of Deputies (Brazil) from São Paulo
Members of the Legislative Assembly of São Paulo